Windows Terminal is a multi-tabbed terminal emulator that Microsoft has developed for Windows 10 and later as a replacement for Windows Console. It can run any command-line app in a separate tab. It is preconfigured to run Command Prompt, PowerShell, WSL, SSH, and Azure Cloud Shell Connector. Windows Terminal comes with its own rendering back-end; starting with version 1.11 on Windows 11, command-line apps can run using this newer back-end instead of the old Windows Console.

History 
Windows Terminal was announced at Microsoft's Build 2019 developer conference in May 2019 as a modern alternative for Windows Console, and Windows Terminal's source code first appeared on GitHub on May 3, 2019. The first preview release was version 0.2, which appeared on July 10, 2019. The first stable version of the project (version 1.0) was on May 19, 2020, at which point, Microsoft started releasing preview versions as the Windows Terminal Preview app, which could be installed side-by-side with the stable version.

Features
Terminal is a command-line front-end. It can run multiple command-line apps, including text-based shells in a multi-tabbed window. It has out-of-the-box support for Command Prompt, PowerShell, and Bash on Windows Subsystem for Linux (WSL). It can natively connect to Azure Cloud Shell.

Terminal augments the text-based command experience by providing support for:

 Notebook tabs, to hold multiple instances in a single window
 ANSI VT sequence support
 UTF-8 and UTF-16 (including CJK ideograms and emojis)
 Hardware-accelerated text rendering via DirectWrite
 Modern font and font feature support (see below)
 24-bit color
 Window transparency effects
 Themes, background images and tab color settings
 Different window modes (e.g. fullscreen mode, focus mode, always on top mode)
 Split panes
 Command palette
 Jump list support
 Microsoft Narrator compatibility via a User Interface Automation (UIA) tree
 Support for embedded hyperlinks
 Copying text to clipboard in HTML and RTF format
 Mouse input
 Customizable key bindings
 Incremental search

Cascadia Code 

Cascadia Code is a purpose-built monospaced font by Aaron Bell of Saja Typeworks for the new command-line interface. It includes programming ligatures and was designed to enhance the look and feel of Windows Terminal, terminal applications and text editors such as Visual Studio and Visual Studio Code. The font is open-source under the SIL Open Font License and available on GitHub. It is bundled with Windows Terminal since version 0.5.2762.0.

See also

List of terminal emulators
Comparison of command shells

Notes

References

External links
Introductory post

Windows Terminal overview

Free terminal emulators
Windows commands
Windows components
Microsoft free software
Free software programmed in C++
Software using the MIT license
2019 software
Windows-only free software